Racal may refer to:

People 

 Maris Racal (born 1997), Filipina actress and singer-songwriter
 Kevin Racal (born 1991), Filipino professional basketball player

Other uses 

 Racal suit, a protective suit with powered air-purifying respirator
 Racal,  British electronics company